One PH is a 24/7 Tagalog-language teleradio news channel owned by MediaQuest Holdings, Inc. through Cignal TV. It was soft launched on February 18, 2019 and was officially launched on July 31, 2019, on satellite provider Cignal. It can also be seen via Sulit TV and other DTT Set-top boxes in Mega Manila and in other cities all over the Philippines. One PH is the third MediaQuest channel launched under the One branding (presently known as the One Network Media Group), along with the English-language news channel One News, cable sports channel One Sports+, free TV sports channel One Sports, and now-defunct premium entertainment channel One Screen.

One PH is a joint partnership of MVP Group's media properties Pilipino Star Ngayon (a filipino tabloid of the sister English newspaper The Philippine Star), with its sister tabloids, PM: Pang Masa (National), The Freeman, and Banat by The Freeman (Regional), 92.3 Radyo5 True FM and News5.

History
On January 13, 2019, AksyonTV was rebranded into all-sports network 5 Plus. With this move, Radyo Singko programs that were simulcast on AksyonTV moved to the then-unnamed channel. Meanwhile, 5 Plus, which took over DWNB-TV's terrestrial (analog) TV space, moved to Cignal channel 15. However, on January 17, 2019, just 4 days after the move, the Radyo Singko simulcast channel was reassigned from channel 6 to channel 1, temporarily replacing Cignal's community promotion channel. 5 Plus later took over channel 6, but remained simulcasting on channel 15 until February 17, 2019.

On February 18, 2019, the same standalone channel was soft-launched as One PH, reverting its Cignal channel assignment back to channel 6. Alongside this, Radyo Singko unveiled its new refurbished studios and new content were announced to be added to the program line-up of Radyo Singko and One PH.

On July 31, 2019, One PH, was formally launched by Cignal TV as a 24/7 all-Filipino news, public affairs and entertainment channel and are categorized into three blocks: NewsKom (News Komentaryo/News Commentary) (newscasts and talk shows), KKK (Katarungan, Karapatan at Kaalaman/Justice, Rights and Knowledge) (public service and infotainment) and SnS (Showbiz and Sports).

In August 2019, selected Radyo Singko and One PH programs (Morning Calls, One Balita, One Balita Pilipinas, Wag Po! and Turbo Time with Mike and Lindy) begin its airing on either simulcast or delayed basis on TV5 as part of programming revamp spearheaded by TV5 Network's new CEO Jane Basas.

On March 8, 2020, One PH was given a slightly revamped look (along with One News and the rebranded One Sports and One Sports+) and reassigned to Cignal channel 1, replacing the community promotion channel, while One Sports (launched as a free-to-air channel replacing 5 Plus) was reassigned to channel 6.

On March 17, 2020, One PH along with One News, temporarily suspended its regular programming as an effect of the Luzon-wide "enhanced community quarantine" due to the COVID-19 pandemic. The news channel aired the special edition of One News Now.

On May 22, 2020, One PH successfully began conducting test transmissions on digital terrestrial television via DWET-TV subchannel 5.3 in Mega Manila. This development signifies the reinstatement of Radyo5's "RadyoVision" format on free-to-air television after its predecessor, AksyonTV carried over most of the radio station's programs from 2011 to 2019. This would later spread out in other cities of the Philippines starting in mid-2021, in preparation for the launching of the network's DTTB service, Sulit TV.

In December 2020, Cignal TV and Philstar Media Group took over the operations and programming of Radyo Singko respectively. With this development, some of the station's programs aired their respective final episodes during the final weeks of December 2020. On January 1, 2021, One PH's programming (except for overnight slots) have been integrated to the programming schedule of Radyo Singko.

On January 1, 2021, all programs of One PH are simulcast on One Sports via live streaming on its website, as well as Radyo5 92.3 News FM (now 92.3 Radyo5 True FM; except overnight slots). The livestream later reverted to One Sports a few days later.

Programming

Majority of its programming are sourced and simulcasted from 92.3 True FM Radyo5, a practice that was carried over from its predecessor AksyonTV, and following suit with other Mega Manila news radio stations (ABS-CBN TeleRadyo, DZRH News Television, Inquirer 990 Television, Dobol B TV block on GTV, ALIW Channel 23 and Radyo Bandido TV) and regional news radio stations (such as Brigada News TV in General Santos, DWNE TeleRadyo in Nueva Ecija, Tirad Pass Network in Ilocos Sur, PRTV 12 in Tacloban, eMedia TV in Zamboanga, and Bandera News TV in Palawan). The rest of its content are One PH's original content and brokered programming which are not aired, but since 2021, also simulcasting on Radyo5 (except for overnight slots, Rated Korina, and during PBA sa Radyo5 coverage days).
The integrated programming of Radyo5 and One PH ended upon the launch of the former's new inhouse programs in January 2023, though its integrated weekend programming remains intact.

Hosts and news anchors
Gretchen Ho
Ted Failon
Julius Babao
Cheryl Cosim
Jove Francisco
Sen. Raffy Tulfo
Maricel Halili
Christine Bersola-Babao
Chinkee Tan
Ed Lingao 
Patricia Fernandez
Sharee Roman
Atty. Garreth Tungol
Atty. Danilo Tungol 
Atty. Blessie Abad 
Atty. Gabriel Ilaya 
Atty. Ina Magpale 
Atty. Gail Dela Cruz
Atty. Sam Ferrer
Atty. Joren Tan
Aanaan Singh
Marsh Salcedo
Lourd de Veyra
Jay Taruc
Korina Sanchez
Mon Gualvez (Voiceover)
Cherry Bayle
Chiqui Vergel
Czarina Guevara (also known as DJ Chacha)
Rizza Diaz
Diego Castro
Angela Lagunzad
Noli Eala
Mer Layson
MJ Marfori
Clang Garcia
Stanley Chi
Dr. Rica Cruz
Robert Teo
Cristy Fermin
Romel Chika

Mobile journalists
Yeddha Pascual
Julie Baiza
Pamela Vasquez
King Sengco
Francis Orcio
Aira Siguenza
Belle Gregorio

See also
TV5
One Sports
5 Plus (defunct)
DWET-TV
92.3 Radyo5 True FM
News5
One News
AksyonTV (defunct)
Dobol B TV
TeleRadyo

References

External links
 
 

TV5 Network channels
24-hour television news channels in the Philippines
Television networks in the Philippines
Television channels and stations established in 2019
Filipino-language television stations
Cignal TV